Disley is a village and civil parish in Cheshire East, England.

It may also refer to:

Places

 Disley, Saskatchewan, a village in Canada
 Disley Aerodrome, Saskatchewan, Canada
 Disley railway station, Cheshire East, England
 Disley Tunnel, England

People

 Disley Jones, an English stage and film designer
 Craig Disley, an English professional footballer
 Diz Disley, an Anglo-Canadian jazz guitarist
 Frances Disley, a British artist, print-maker and curator
 Gary Disley, a professional rugby league footballer
 John Disley, a Welsh athlete
 Terry Disley, a jazz keyboardist